Stephen Lynch fitz James, Mayor of Galway,  1499–1524.

Lynch is believed to have been son of James Lynch fitz Stephen, Mayor 1493–94. He and Peter French were the town bailiffs 1499–1500 under Mayor James Lynch fitz Martin. Stephen served three terms as Mayor: 1509–10, 1516–17 and 1523. During his first term he passed a statute penalising anyone who kept any swine or goats in town for more than 14 days.

See also

 Galway
 Tribes of Galway
 Mayors of Galway

References
 History of Galway, James Hardiman, Galway, 1820.
 Old Galway, Maureen Donovan O'Sullivan, 1942.
 Henry, William (2002). Role of Honour: The Mayors of Galway City 1485-2001. Galway: Galway City Council.  
 Martyn, Adrian (2016). The Tribes of Galway: 1124-1642

Mayors of Galway
Politicians from County Galway